The Land and Overland trilogy is a group of three science fantasy novels by Northern Irish writer Bob Shaw.

The trilogy consists of the books The Ragged Astronauts (published in  1986), The Wooden Spaceships (1988) and The Fugitive Worlds (1989).  In the United Kingdom, all three novels were originally published by Victor Gollancz.  The Ragged Astronauts won the BSFA Award for best Novel in 1987.

The setting for the trilogy is a pair of planets, Land and Overland, which orbit about a common centre of gravity, close enough to each other that they share a common atmosphere.

Plot

The Ragged Astronauts

Land is a strictly feudal society that undergoes a peak energy crisis (the trees that provide energy and hard materials are scarce), and is undergoing a process of cultural decay. Much of the human population of Land travels to Overland via hot-air balloon to escape airborne creatures called the Ptertha.

Translations 
 Russian:  ("Astonauts in Rags"), 2003
 German: , 1991
 Czech: , 1993
 Polish:  ("Space removal"), 1994
 Italian:  ("The Ptertha invasion, or Challenge to the sky"), 1999
 Romanian:

The Wooden Spaceships

Conflict breaks out between the new inhabitants of Overland and those who stayed behind on Land and, having developed an immunity to the Ptertha, intend to invade Overland. The inhabitants of Overland manage to defeat them by erecting a network of fortresses between the two planets. The spaceships of the title are made of a super-hard wood, brakka.

Translations 
 Russian:  ("The Wooden Spaceships"), 2003
 German: , 1991
 Czech: , 1996
 Italian:  ("The attack to the world"), 2000
 Romanian: N/A

The Fugitive Worlds

A strange object begins to approach the planets from outer space.

Translations 
 Russian:  ("The Fugitive Planets"), 2003
 German: , 1991
 Italian:  ("Towards the Unknown"), 2000

Reception
Orson Scott Card reviewed the first volume favourably, saying "The Ragged Astronauts is what an 18th-century hard-sf novel might have been, if Swift or Defoe had paid more attention to Newton. There are marvels enough to make you feel like you're discovering science fiction for the first time. . . . Shaw writes with an extraordinary combination of intelligence, clarity, and compassion."

References

Science fiction book series
Novels by Bob Shaw